Levan, also known as Leon (1503–1574), was a Georgian monarch of the Bagrationi dynasty, who reigned as king of Kakheti in eastern Georgia from 1518/1520 to 1574. He presided over the most prosperous and peaceful period in the history of the Kakhetian realm.

Levan's presumed tomb was discovered in the south-western corner of the Gremi church in 2021.

Biography 
He was the son of George II of Kakheti by his wife Helene née Irubakidze-Cholokashvili. George II led a series of unsuccessful raids into his western neighbor, kingdom of Kartli, ruled by a rival branch of the Bagrationi. In 1513, he was captured and put in prison, while his kingdom was taken over by David X of Kartli. Levan was taken by loyal nobles to the mountains and kept there clandestinely until 1518, when they capitalized on the invasion of Kartli by Ismail I, the Safavid Shah of Iran, and proclaimed Levan king of Kakheti. David X led his army against Kakheti, but failed to seize Levan and withdrew. In 1520, the two kings made peace and forged an alliance.

Having secured the crown, Levan forced the highlanders of eastern Georgia into submission and established friendly relations with the Shamkhal of Tarki in Dagestan. In 1521, he mounted an expedition against Hassan-Bey, the ruler of Shaki in Shirvan, took the city and had Hassan executed. Shaki was under the patronage of Iran, and when Ismail I marched against Kakheti, Levan’s courage began to fail. He officially accepted the shah’s suzerainty and agreed to pay tribute. He reaffirmed his loyalty to the new shah, Tahmasp I, in 1541, and even helped him subdue rebellious Shaki in 1551.

In the 1555 Treaty of Amasya, Ottoman and Saffavid empires divided the South Caucasus in their spheres of influence, with Kakheti falling into the Iranian orbit. Pressured by the presence of an Iranian army near the Kakhetian borders, Levan had to send his son Vakhtang (also known as Jesse) as a political hostage to the Saffavid court where the prince was converted to Islam, named Isa-Khan and appointed a governor of Shaki. In 1561, he was forced to deny aid to his son-in-law Simon I of Kartli against the Iranians. He allowed, however, his beloved son George to volunteer on the side of Simon, but the Georgian army was crushed at the battle of Tsikhedidi and George himself died on the battlefield.

Levan, then, attempted to counterbalance the Iranian hegemony by enlisting the Russian support and sent, in 1561, an embassy to Ivan IV. Levan’s Russian contacts enabled him to recruit a detachment of the Russian soldiers from the Terek Valley in 1564. The presence of the Russian contingent in Kakheti drew a protest from Iran, and Levan was forced to disband it in 1571.

In general, Kakheti remained a peaceful country during Levan’s reign. Flanked by the Gilan-Shemakha-Astrakhan "silk route", the kingdom was actively involved in the regional trade. In contrast to other parts of Georgia, the towns and countryside prospered and attracted people from the harassed lands of Kartli as well as Armenian and Persian merchants and craftsmen. Levan was known as a significant royal patron of culture, and his portraits
survive in many of the churches he endowed, including Gremi.

Levan died in 1574, being survived by five sons among whom a violent dispute over succession soon broke out. According to the 18th-century Georgian historian Prince Vakhushti, the animosity between the brothers was at least partially precipitated by Levan’s preferential treatment of his son by the second marriage over those by the first marriage, particularly Alexander, who was his eldest son, and, hence, a legitimate heir to the throne. Alexander, indeed, emerged victorious and became the next king of Kakheti.

Family 
Levan was married twice; first to Tinatin (died 1591), daughter of Mamia I Gurieli, Prince of Guria. She gave birth to at least two sons:

 Alexander II of Kakheti (1527–1605)
 Jesse (Isa-Khan) (d. 1580)

Levan divorced Tinatin in 1529 and married a daughter of Kamal Kara-Musel, Shamkhal of Tarku. They were the parents of:

 Prince Giorgi (c. 1529 – 6 April 1561)
 Prince Nikoloz (died 1591), Catholicos-Patriarch of Georgia (1584–89)
 Prince El-Mirza (c. 1532 – 1580)
 Prince Konstantine (c. 1532 – 1549) 
 Prince Vakhtang (born before 1549)
 Prince Erekle (born before 1549)
 Prince Bagrat (before 1549 – 1568)
 Prince David (born before 1553)
 Prince Teimuraz (born before 1558 – 1568)
 Prince Khosro (fl. 1568)
 Princess Elene (died 1550), married, in 1544, to Erekle, son of Bagrat Mukhran-Batoni, 1st Prince of Mukhrani.
 Princess Nestan-Darejan (fl. 1556–1612), married King Simon I of Kartli.
 Princess Ketevan (fl. 1559–1597), married the nobleman Vakhushti Gogibashvili; retired to the Akura monastery in 1597.
 Princess Tekle (fl. 1597–1603). She was a nun at a nunnery at the Alaverdi monastery and had an amorous affair with Prince Baram Cholokashvili, Bishop of Alaverdi. When the affair was revealed, the catholicos Domentius II excommunicated the couple, who sought refuge in Imereti. King Alexander II later allowed them to return to Kakheti and marry c. 1603.

References 

1503 births
1574 deaths
Bagrationi dynasty of the Kingdom of Kakheti
Kings of Kakheti
16th-century people of Safavid Iran